North Jersey comprises the northern portions of the U.S. state of New Jersey between the upper Delaware River and the Atlantic Ocean.  As a distinct toponym, North Jersey is a colloquial one rather than an administrative one, reflecting geographical and perceived cultural and other differences between it and the southern part of the state.

North Jersey is characterized by its position, both geographically and culturally, within the greater New York City metropolitan area, as well as its high economic output, including its regional economic engines of Paramus in Bergen County, which had $6 billion in annual retail sales as of 2018 and Jersey City whose financial district has been nicknamed Wall Street West, Newark Liberty International Airport in Newark, and Port Newark–Elizabeth Marine Terminal. 

Bergen County is the most populous county in both North Jersey and the state and serves as the western terminus for the George Washington Bridge, the world's busiest motor vehicle bridge, which connects Fort Lee, New Jersey to Upper Manhattan in New York City. Newark, located in Essex County, is New Jersey's most populous city. Jersey City, Paterson, and Elizabeth, located in Hudson, Passaic, and Union counties in North Jersey are the second, third, and fourth most populous cities in the state after Newark.

The definition of the North Jersey region of the state most consistently includes Bergen, Essex, Hudson, Morris, Passaic, Sussex, Union, and Warren counties, though definitions of North Jersey vary and may include other New York metropolitan area New Jersey counties that are sometimes considered “Central Jersey”, such as Middlesex County, Monmouth County, Somerset County, Hunterdon County, and even the northern portion or majority of Ocean County.

Geography

Geologically, the north is largely in the Piedmont Province, the Highlands Province, and the Ridge and Valley Province. Depending on definitions, some is counted as being in the Atlantic coastal plain.

North Jersey has a Humid Continental Climate (Dfb) by Köppen.

Various definitions 
One particular definition of North Jersey includes all points in New Jersey north of I-295 in the western part of the state and all points north of I-195 in the eastern part of the state. Another definition uses the old 1958 telephone area code (not the modern area code) and all its additions, as this area code loosely included all of New Jersey north of Trenton. Some people, especially residents of the northern tier of counties, use a narrower definition, counting only that area north of the mouth of the Raritan River. Conversely, people in the most southern parts of the state and within the Philadelphia metropolitan area (ie South Jersey), when using a two-portion approach that excludes “Central Jersey” as a separate category, may define North Jersey as consisting of Ocean County and every county north of it, essentially placing all New Jersey counties within the New York metropolitan area under the definition of North Jersey. The state is also sometimes described as having North Jersey and South Jersey separated from each other by Central Jersey.

Further subdivision 
In 2008, the New Jersey State Department of Tourism divided the state into six tourist regions with the Gateway and  Skylands regions included in North Jersey.

Counties most consistently defined as North Jersey counties

The following counties are most consistently considered North Jersey:

Bergen County
Union County
Essex County
Hudson County
Morris County
Passaic County 
Sussex County
Warren County

History
North Jersey was the site of some of the earliest European settlements in what would become the United States of America. Its colonial history started after Henry Hudson sailed through Newark Bay in 1609. Although Hudson was British, he worked for the Netherlands, so he claimed the land for the Dutch as part of the provincial colony of New Netherland, with original settlements were centered on Bergen (today's Hudson County). In 1664 the region became part of the Province of New Jersey.

During the American Revolutionary War, New Jersey was a strategic location between New York City, and the Continental Congress in Philadelphia. Important materials necessary to the war effort were produced in North Jersey. The Continental Army made its home here during the war, and history from this period can be found in nearly every village and town in North Jersey. Battle fields, camps, skirmish sites, and headquarters can be found near Morristown and north in the Preakness Valley. In the northwestern part of the state, iron mines and foundries supplied raw material for guns and ammunition.

The Industrial Revolution in America started by the founding of the North Jersey town of Paterson. Today, the United States and the world enjoy the fruit born of seeds planted in North Jersey during the Industrial Revolution. Alexander Hamilton, Secretary for the Treasury and President of the Bank of New York during the end of the eighteenth century, selected the Great Falls area (also known as the Passaic Falls) for an ambitious experiment. He promoted the natural power of the Great Falls as an excellent location for textile mills and other manufacture.

Paterson attracted skilled craftsmen and engineers from Europe to run the mills and produced a large concentration of creative and able people. During the mid nineteenth century, many of the engines and materials that would be used to colonize a continent were made here. Thomas Edison installed one of the first hydroelectric power plants in the world using the Great Falls as an energy source. This power plant still provides electricity today.

In West Orange, Edison created the first technical research and development facility with his "invention factory". Electric light, improved motion pictures, and sound recording, were among the hundreds of inventions produced here.

Demographics
The seven counties that are included in North Jersey have a total population of 3,492,590 as of the 2000 U.S. Census. The demographics of all of the counties are 66.8% White, 18.5% Hispanic or Latino, 15.4% African American, 6.6% Asian, 0.2% Native American, and 0.1% Pacific Islander.

Population

Professional sports fans
Sports allegiances are often divided between the northern and southern portions of the state.  The 2009 World Series divided the people of New Jersey, because South Jersey residents generally root for the Philadelphia Phillies, while North Jersey residents usually root for the New York Yankees or the New York Mets. A similar trend exists for most other major sports, with North Jersey residents supporting the Brooklyn Nets or the New York Knicks in basketball, the New Jersey Devils, or the New York Rangers in hockey, the New York Red Bulls or New York City FC in soccer, and the New York Giants or the New York Jets in football.

Dialect

Notable North Jerseyans 
People from Bergen County
People from Essex County
People from Hudson County
People from Morris County
People from Passaic County
People from Sussex County
People from Warren County
People from Ocean County

See also
Central Jersey
South Jersey

References and footnotes

External links
"Where is North and South Jersey?, a blog article

 
New Jersey culture
New York metropolitan area
Regions of New Jersey